In military terms, 150th Division or 150th Infantry Division may refer to:

 150th Division (People's Republic of China)
 150th Rifle Division (Soviet Union)

See also
 150th Infantry Brigade (United Kingdom)
 150th Regiment (disambiguation)
 150th Air Refueling Squadron

sl:150. divizija